Babla Mehta is an Indian Hindi film playback singer as well as a composer and audio engineer from Delhi.

Career

As singer

He had sung some songs with "Anuradha Paudwal". (Sadak. Dil Hai Ki Manta Nahin .) And many bhajans with her.
 "Tere Mere Hoton Pe" with Lata Mangeshkar became his debut song in Hindi films. Soon, Babla was singing for leading music directors like Nadeem-Shravan, Rajesh Roshan, Bappi Lahiri, Anu Malik, etc. Some of the blockbusters in which he sang were Chandni, Dil Hai Ke Maanta Nahi and Sadak.

Filmography

1.	Chandni (1989)

2.	Jeene Do (1990)

3.	Dil Hai Ke Manta Nahin (1991)

4.	Sadak (1991)

5.	Naamcheen (1991)

6.	Chhota Sa Ghar (1992)

7.	Tahalka (1992)

8.	Janam Se Pehle (1994)

9.	Pyar Ka Rog (1994)

9.	Nazzar (1995)

Albums

1.	Zuban Pe Dard Bhari Daastan (1987)

2.	Mukesh ki Yaadein (Vols. 1-10) (1988)

Live Shows

Babla Mehta started as a stage artiste. His live show audience spans continents to the West Indies, USA, Canada, UK, the Netherlands, Portugal, South Africa, Mauritius, Singapore, Thailand, and the Middle East:

 Rajesh Roshan show – World Tour  
 Madhuri Dixit show – London, USA, Canada
 Shahrukh Khan, Juhi Chawla show – World Tour 
 Bappi Lahiri show – South Africa
 Akshay Kumar show – World Tour
 Solo show on Raj Kapoor at Rang Sharda Auditorium
 Bandra Mumbai ‘Kehta Hai Joker’ 
 Golkonda Resort, Hyderabad 
 Solo show on Raj Kapoor titled  The Showman, Rang Sharda Auditorium, Bandra, Mumbai 
 Live solo show on Mukesh titled Mukesh – RK to Big B at Manek Sabhagraha, Mumbai
 Live solo show on Mukesh titled Mukesh – RK to Big B at Siri Fort Auditorium, New Delhi

Bhajan Albums

1.	Sampoorna Sundar Kaand (1988)

2.	Bajrang Baan (1988)

3.	Mamta Ka Mandir (1991)

4.	Parv Kumbh Ka Nyara (1996)

5.	Jaya Shree Hanumaan (1997)

6.	Ram Charit Maanas (1997)

7.	Bhakti Saagar

8.	Jag Janani

9.    Pahadon wali matarani

As Composer

Among his many compositions are four poems penned by Ex-Prime Minister Atal Behari Vajpayee in 2011 and performed live by Babla twice on Atalji’s Birthday in New Delhi: Sapna Toot Gaya (2011), GeetNahinGataHoon (2011), Tan Par Pehra (2012), and Kadam Badha Kar Chalna Hoga (2012) and also Babla Mehta has composed so many commercials.

References

Bollywood playback singers
Indian male playback singers
Living people
Indian film score composers
Bhajan singers
Indian male film score composers
Year of birth missing (living people)